Acrophylla is a genus of stick insects in the family Phasmatidae.

Species
 Acrophylla bhaskarai Conle & Henneman, 2018
 Acrophylla caesarea (Redtenbacher 1908)
 Acrophylla caprella (Westwood 1859)
 Acrophylla enceladus Gray, G.R. 1835
 Acrophylla maindroni (Redtenbacher 1908)
 Acrophylla nubilosa Tepper 1905
 Acrophylla sichuanensis Chen, S.C. & Y.H. He 2001
 Acrophylla thoon (Stål 1877)
 Acrophylla titan (Macleay 1826) - type species (as Phasma titan Macleay WS)
 Acrophylla wuelfingi (Redtenbacher 1908)

External links

Phasmatodea genera
Taxa named by George Robert Gray